Hathi is an elephant character in Kipling's The Jungle Book.

Hathi may also refer to:
 Thornycroft Hathi, a 4x4 military lorry of 1924
 HathiTrust, a shared digital repository, including the Google Book Search project
 Haathi Parvat, a mountain peak in the Himalayas
 Elephant in Hindi
 The word 'hathis' is used in Kipling's 1890 Mandalay (poem), referencing elephants stacking teak logs.

See also
 Humanities Advanced Technology and Information Institute (HATII), a research institute at the University of Glasgow
 Haathi Mere Saathi (disambiguation)